Bolta Pakistan is a live current affairs talk show on AAJ TV. The show was originally hosted by Nusrat Javed and Mushtaq Minhas (from 7 May 2007 to 15 April 2010) and ran Monday through Friday from 11 PM to midnight (Pakistan Standard Time.) After the two anchors left, from 4 October 2010, Orya Maqbool Jan and Saleem Bukhari hosted the show on Monday and Tuesday, 11:00 PM to Midnight (Pakistan Standard Time). The show celebrated its first anniversary on 7 May 2008. It was initially aired from Rawalpindi. Presently, it is hosted from Lahore. Later, Javed and Minhas returned once again to resume hosting the show, and are the shows current hosts since 14 February 2011.

Mushtaq Minhas and Nusrat Javed, with their polar opposite views on everything in life, fight it out on the big issues to show you every angle of the situation. Public and high-ranking officials' calls make the show one of the most relevant and dynamic shows on television. The first of its kind format that has made 11pm the new prime time on news channels and has generated several similar shows on other channels.

Format

Discussion style
Mushtaq Minhas starts the show with a brief introduction. Nusrat Javed then adds his introduction. Then the duo holds a brief discussion about various current affairs topic and accept call-ins during discussions. The show aims to keep track of open discussions over subsequent shows.

Call-ins
The duo accepts call-in questions, Callers are identified by name and city. Occasionally, famous guests telephone the show and comment, like Journalists, Politicians, and celebrities. The phone number for call-ins is +92-51-280-5031.

E-mails
The duo also accepts e-mail questions or comments.

Notes

External links
Bolta Pakistan - on Aaj News
Bolta Pakistan - Pakistan Reporter
Watch Bolta Pakistan Episodes
Bolta Pakistan Recordings

Pakistani television talk shows